Stillwater Mining Company is a palladium and platinum mining company with headquarters located at Littleton, Colorado, United States. It is the only palladium and platinum producer in the USA. The only other North America based palladium/platinum producer is North American Palladium, located in Canada. As of 2015, the President and Chief Executive Officer was Mick McMullen.

In December 2010, the Company acquired Marathon PGM Corporation. It was renamed Stillwater Canada.

Processing Mined Material

Stillwater Mining Company is engaged in the development, extraction, processing, refining and marketing of palladium, platinum and associated metals (platinum group metals or PGMs) from a geological formation in the Stillwater igneous complex in south central Montana known as the J-M Reef and from the recycling of spent catalytic converters. The J-M Reef is the only known significant source of platinum group metals inside the United States and one of the significant resources outside South Africa and Russia. Associated by-product metals at the Company’s operations include minor amounts of gold, silver, nickel and copper.

The company conducts mining operations at the Stillwater Mine near Nye, Montana and at the East Boulder Mine near Big Timber, Montana. Both mines are located on the J-M Reef. The company operates concentrating plants at each mining operation to upgrade mined production to a concentrate form. The company operates a smelter and base metal refinery at Columbus, Montana at which it further purifies the mined production to a PGM-rich filter cake. The filter cake is shipped to third-party custom refiners for final refining before being sold.

The company recycles spent catalyst material to recover PGMs at the smelter and refinery. The company has a longterm catalyst sourcing agreement and spot contracts with other suppliers who ship spent catalysts to the company for processing to recover PGMs. The company smelts and refines the spent catalysts by the same process as the mined production is purified.

Business
Norilsk Nickel had bought a 51% stake in Stillwater in 2003, but in November 2010 Norilsk Nickel announced plans to sell this stake.

Controversies
In 2002, two class action suits were filed against the company, wherein stakeholders claimed that the Stillwater was artificially inflating the price of its securities. On Nov 1, 2004, Stillwater Mining restated its third quarter results, during which payment for debt issuance costs was $3.8 million, not a receipt of $0.8 million as originally reported.

In 2006, a group of shareholders won a $2.6 million settlement against the company for "misleading statements about the company's financial performance" and its ore reserves.

Acquisition
Nornickel purchased Stillwater in 2003. In 2010, Nornickel put Stillwater up for sale.
The South African mining company Sibanye Gold Limited proposed in December 2016 to acquire Stillwater for $2.2 billion ($18/share, a 61-percent premium over its average share price during the previous 52 weeks). The merger was approved by the Committee on Foreign Investments in April 2017 and was completed in May. The new owners pledged to honor Stillwater's Good Neighbor Agreement, which requires notification of surrounding communities about anything which might affect them.

References

External links
Stillwater Mining Company website

Companies listed on the New York Stock Exchange
Palladium mining companies
Platinum mining companies
Companies based in Montana
Non-renewable resource companies established in 1992
Stillwater County, Montana